Yılmaz Erdoğan (born 4 November 1967) is a Turkish filmmaker, actor and poet who is most famous for his box-office record-breaking debut comedy film Vizontele (2001) and the television series Bir Demet Tiyatro (1995–2002/2006–2007). He founded BKM Theatre and Film Production. He was awarded the Best Supporting Actor at 4th Australian Academy of Cinema and Television Arts Awards for his performance in The Water Diviner (2014).

Biography
Yilmaz Erdoğan spent his childhood in Ankara until he moved to Istanbul along with his family. His family is of Kurdish origin. In 1987, he dropped out of his civil engineering studies at Istanbul Technical University and joined the On Duty Theater Staff managed by Ferhan Şensoy. He also became chief screenwriter at Levent Kırca’s long-running television sketch show, Olacak O Kadar. In 1988, he founded his own theatre company, Güldüşündürü, and staged a successful production of his self-penned Suleiman the Magnificent and Rambo.

In 1994, he founded Beşiktaş Cultural Center with business partner Necati Akpınar and achieved recognition as Mükremin Abi alongside actress Demet Akbağ in the ground breaking television series Bir Demet Tiyatro (1995–2002) on Star TV. He also continued his theatrical success with a series of plays and musicals, including his one-man show, Cebimdeki Kelimeler, and recorded a poetry album called, Kayıp Kentin Yakışıklısı, which includes seventeen poems accompanied by traditional Turkish music composed by Metin Kalender, Nizamettin Ariç and Ali Aykaç.

He achieved his greatest success with the box-office record breaking comedy film Vizontele (2001), which he wrote, directed and starred in. This was followed by a sequel, Vizontele Tuuba (2004), which he also produced, and Magic Carpet Ride (2005). A second run for his popular television series Bir Demet Tiyatro (2006–2007) followed on ATV, and the Christmas comedy film Jolly Life (2009). He has also produced the successful comedy films Eyyvah Eyvah (2010) and Çok Filim Hareketler Bunlar (2010).

His brothers are Mustafa Erdoğan, who founded Fire of Anatolia and Deniz Erdoğan, who has composed music for some of his company's productions. His wife is the actress and costume designer Belçim Bilgin, a descendant from the family of Sheikh Said, the leader of the Sheikh Said Rebellion and his daughter Berfin Erdoğan appeared in Magic Carpet Ride.

Filmography

Theater

Books

References

 Biyografi.info - Biography of Yılmaz Erdoğan
 IMDb - Filmography of Yılmaz Erdoğan
 Boston Turkish Film Festival - Organize İşler (Magic Carpet Ride)

External links
 Yılmaz Erdoğan's poems
 

1967 births
Living people
People from Hakkâri
Istanbul Technical University alumni
Turkish male film actors
Turkish film directors
Turkish people of Kurdish descent
Best Supporting Actor AACTA Award winners